Granarolo may refer to:

 Granarolo (company), an Italian food company
 Granarolo Bologna, an Italian professional basketball club based in Bologna, Italy
 Granarolo dell'Emilia, a municipality in the Metropolitan City of Bologna, Italy